Tandai is a suburb of Honiara located  west of the main center on the Tandai Highway. Tandai is in the Honiara City Council ward of Nggosi.

Tandai is east of White River and west of Rove.

RAMSI
The former RAMSI HQ was located at Leilei, Tandai.

Land disputes
On Friday 26 June 2009, Solomon Islands Parliament passed a private member’s motion  calling on the government to address land management and administration issues in Honiara. The motion moved by leader of the official independent group, Hon Isaac Inoke Tosika, member for West Honiara, sought to direct the government to urgently act to address the crisis in the management and administration of land in Honiara, including:

 3. Providing resources and technical assistance to the Ministry of Lands to address land management issues such as:
 the need to acquire and subdivide undeveloped Fixed Term Estates such as those in Tandai, West Honiara, and where appropriate make them available to citizens who have had long term residency on those lands;
Squatter settlements in the Tandai area were caused by people who had settled on government land under temporary occupancy leases were evicted after the land was then allocated to foreign companies.

Tandai Land owning tribes and the Honiara City Council have engaged in a boundary consultation process to address the illegal Honiara City Boundary expansion 

By the end of the twentieth century, much urban growth was taking place in Tandai, causing planning problems related to provision of services and related issues, and also issues of access to land. These land issues became even more central during the ethnic tension and resulted in the evacuation of some of these areas in this period, although in many cases, agreements had been reached with traditional land owners.The urban area of Tandai more than tripled over the decade with an annual growth rate of 12.8 percent,

Churches

 Bishop's Dale Church of Melanesia, the Anglican church was the site of election rallies in 2004
 Assembly of God Christian Life Center 
 Was built in 1986 and is the AoG HQ for Honiara with an estimated 100 members.

Villages
 Lower Tasahe
 Rifle Range
 Tavioa Ridge

Tourism
 Tropicana Motel
 Tandai motel

Oxfam

The Oxfam building is located in Tandai and there are four strands to Oxfam’s work:

 Gender justice
 Oxfam works with a local NGO called the Family Support Centre (FSC) to address gender based violence, sexual abuse and child abuse. FSC offer emergency accommodation,  legal and counseling services, run educational programs, maintain a resource library and raise awareness of GBV and women and children’s rights. They work closely with support agencies such as the police, as well as NGOs.
 Capacity-building
 Oxfam strengthens FSC’s long term sustainability and organizational development.
 Community engagement
 Oxfam supports community members as facilitators to run workshops that look at social inclusion, gender stereotypes, violence triggers and alternative actions.
Advocacy
 Oxfam encourages agencies including the government and the judiciary to work together to promote and ensure the safety of women.>

Utilities

The Tangai area is one of the lowest proportions of households with piped water, although efforts are underway to extend this supply

References

External links
 Tandai Facebook page

Suburbs of Honiara